Luca Ciriani (born 26 January 1967) is an Italian politician who is the group leader of the Brothers of Italy grouping in the Senate of the Republic.

He had succeeded Federico D'Incà as Minister for Parliamentary Relations in the Meloni Cabinet.

See also 

 List of current Italian senators

References 

Living people
1967 births
20th-century Italian politicians
21st-century Italian politicians
University of Trieste alumni
Brothers of Italy politicians
Senators of Legislature XVIII of Italy
Government ministers of Italy
Meloni Cabinet
Italian neo-fascist politicians